Chauve or Chauvé may refer to:

 Chauvé
 Mount Chauve

People with the surname
 Darlyne Chauve

See also

 La Cantatrice Chauve
 La Chauve-Souris, touring review of the early 20th century
 Chauve-souris, medieval polearm

French-language surnames